The 1969 Brabantse Pijl was the ninth edition of the Brabantse Pijl cycle race and was held on 23 March 1969. The race started and finished in  Sint-Genesius-Rode. The race was won by Willy In 't Ven.

General classification

References

1969
Brabantse Pijl